Aventiola is a monotypic moth genus of the family Erebidae described by Staudinger in 1892. Its only species, Aventiola pusilla, was first described by Arthur Gardiner Butler in 1879. It is found in Japan and south-eastern Siberia.

References

Hypeninae
Monotypic moth genera